Edmonton-Centre formerly styled Edmonton Centre from 1959 to 1971 was a provincial electoral district in Alberta, Canada, mandated to return a single member to the Legislative Assembly of Alberta using the first past the post method of voting from 1959 to 2019.

History
The electoral district of Edmonton-Centre was created in the 1957 boundary redistribution that saw the ridings of Edmonton and Calgary broken up into single member electoral districts when the province reintroduced first past the post.

The 2010 electoral boundary re-distribution kept the riding mostly the same as 2003 except for a realignment on the eastern boundary where it was pushed back to 104 Street instead of completely running along 97 Street like it did before the change.

Boundary history

Electoral history

The electoral district of Edmonton-Centre is currently the oldest continuous active provincial electoral district in the city of Edmonton. It has a long history going back to 1959 when the single transferable vote super districts of Edmonton and Calgary were abolished in favor of single member districts.

Over the years, candidates from four different parties have been elected in the district without being able to return after being defeated. From 1959 to 1986 the riding returned MLA's sitting with governing parties in Alberta while the later years past 1986 MLA's have been returned from the official opposition.

The first elected MLA was Social Credit candidate Ambrose Holowach who had previously served as a Member of Parliament sitting with the federal wing of Social Credit from 1953 to 1958. Holowach was re-elected twice more and served a ministerial portfolio as Provincial Secretary in the governments of Ernest Manning and Harry Strom from 1962 to 1971.

The 1971 election would bring great change to the province and to Edmonton-Centre. Holowach did not run for re-election and the riding was won by Progressive Conservative candidate Gordon Miniely. His party would form government for the first time that year and Miniely would serve in the Peter Lougheed cabinet until he retired from office after his second term in 1979.

Mary LeMessurier would be the third elected representative of the riding. First elected in 1979 she would also be appointed to cabinet like her two predecessors before her. She served as Minister of Culture in the Lougheed government and kept her portfolio briefly after Don Getty became Premier in 1985. She would run for re-election in 1986 but face a stunning defeat by NDP candidate William Roberts.

The NDP party would form the official opposition after electing a record size caucus in 1986. Roberts held his office for two terms before retiring in 1993. That election saw the NDP vote collapse in the district and across the province with NDP candidate Kay Hurtig finishing third place.

After the NDP defeat from opposition in 1993 and the surge of the Liberal party under Laurence Decore the district became a Liberal stronghold, with Michael Henry becoming the first MLA for his party. Henry did not run a second term in office in the 1997 election. The new Liberal candidate was Laurie Blakeman who held the district with a reduced majority.

In the 2015 Alberta General Election NDP Candidate David Shepherd was elected with 54% of the vote.

Legislature results

1959 general election

1963 general election

1967 general election

1971 general election

1975 general election

1979 general election

1982 general election

1986 general election

1989 general election

1993 general election

1997 general election

2001 general election

2004 general election

2008 general election

2012 general election

2015 general election

Senate nominee results

2004 Senate nominee election district results

Voters had the option of selecting 4 Candidates on the Ballot

2012 Senate nominee election district results

Student Vote results

2004 election

On November 19, 2004, a Student Vote was conducted at participating Alberta schools to parallel the 2004 Alberta general election results. The vote was designed to educate students and simulate the electoral process for persons who have not yet reached the legal majority. The vote was conducted in 80 of the 83 provincial electoral districts with students voting for actual election candidates. Schools with a large student body that reside in another electoral district had the option to vote for candidates outside of the electoral district then where they were physically located.

2012 election

See also
List of Alberta provincial electoral districts
Edmonton Centre, a federal electoral district in Alberta, Canada

References

Further reading

External links
Elections Alberta
The Legislative Assembly of Alberta

Former provincial electoral districts of Alberta
Politics of Edmonton